Vincent Mendoza Bueno (born 10 December 1985) is an Austrian singer of Filipino descent.

On 12 January 2008, he became the winner of the ORF programme, Musical! Die Show (Musical! The Show), an Austrian television musical contest.

He also served as a support act for Filipino singer Sarah Geronimo's concert in Vienna. On 18 January 2008, Bueno told the Philippine media of his plans to debut in the Philippines. He then made his first performance in Philippine Television on ASAP XV on 29 August 2010. He also signed a contract under Star Records, an ABS-CBN Entertainment Group Company, to pursue his music career in the Philippines.

He was supposed to represent Austria at the Eurovision Song Contest 2020 in Rotterdam, The Netherlands with the song, "Alive". However, on 18 March 2020, the event was cancelled due to the Coronavirus outbreak. Instead, he represented the country at the Eurovision Song Contest 2021 with the song "Amen", however it did not qualify for the final.

Career

Early education
Bueno started dancing at the age of 4. He later graduated in music and performing arts at the Vienna Conservatory of Music. Bueno is also a composer of R&B music, having taken special courses in acting, dancing, and singing. At age 11, he played four musical instruments—piano, guitar, drums, and bass guitar. His father was a former vocalist and a 1970 local band lead guitarist.

Musical! Die Show
The contest Musical! Die Show began an elimination round on 23 November 2007 with 10 contestants from the 400 beginners who auditioned. Austria and other European televiewers rated / televoted the finalists. "Hair" was Vincent's first number, and he performed the songs "I Wanna Be Like You" from Jungle Book, "Superstar" from Jesus Christ Superstar, "Why God Why?" from Miss Saigon, "Singin' in the Rain", and the German "Supercalifragilisticexpialidocious!" from Mary Poppins. 

Bueno defeated Eva Klikovics and Gudrun Ihninger of 10 contestants / finalists and earned the top prize of 50,000 EUR (3 million PHP) plus the "chance of a lifetime". He first performed "Greased Lightnin'" (from musical Grease), and then "The Music of the Night" (from The Phantom of the Opera). Bueno received 67% of televotes (landslide victory) from televiewers in Austria and nearby countries.

Foray to the Philippines
His first performance on Philippine television's ASAP XV was on 29 August 2010, where he was first introduced as the "Pinoy Champ Austrian Singer". He was on ASAP for some weeks. He also signed a contract under Star Records. However, he returned to Austria on 14 September 2010 to accomplish his pending tasks there. He then went back to the Philippines by early January 2011 to continue his music career.

On 28 October 2011, Vincent held his first ever mini-concert at Teatrino in Greenhills, San Juan, entitled "Got Fridays with Vincent Bueno".

Eurovision Song Contest
On 12 December 2019, ORF internally selected Bueno to represent Austria in the Eurovision Song Contest 2020 in Rotterdam, The Netherlands. He was to perform the song "Alive". However, on 18 March 2020, the event was cancelled due to the COVID-19 pandemic. Later in March 2020, ORF confirmed that Vincent Bueno will instead represent Austria in the Eurovision Song Contest 2021. He performed the song "Amen" in the second semi-final on 20 May 2021, but failed to qualify, finishing 12th.

In June 2021, Bueno released the 2-track EP titled Demos.

Image and Artistry
Vincent's vocal range can be classified as tenor.

Though Vincent has one studio album and a single in German, he has also released some unofficial music videos and audios on his official YouTube and Facebook accounts.

Personal life 
Both his parents are Filipino Ilocano immigrants.

Along with his native German language, Vincent can speak English and conversational Filipino.

Discography

Studio albums

Extended plays

Singles

See also
Musical! Die Show
ASAP XV

References

External links

Videos
youtube.com, Vincent Bueno
www.youtube.com, Vincent Bueno
www.youtube.com, Vincent Bueno sings @ Sarah Geronimo's concert in Vienna
flickr.com, Image, Vincent Bueno

1985 births
Living people

Austrian people of Filipino descent
Singing talent show winners
21st-century Austrian male singers
English-language singers from Austria
Star Music artists
Filipino television personalities
21st-century Filipino male singers
Eurovision Song Contest entrants for Austria
Eurovision Song Contest entrants of 2020
Eurovision Song Contest entrants of 2021